A Street Cat Named Bob is a 2016 British biographical drama film directed by Roger Spottiswoode and written by Tim John and Maria Nation. It is based on the book of the same name and The World According to Bob by James Bowen. The film stars Luke Treadaway, Ruta Gedmintas, Joanne Froggatt, Anthony Head, and Bob the Cat as himself. The film premiered in London on 3 November 2016, followed by a general release the next day. The title is a spoof of A Streetcar Named Desire.

The film won Best British Film at the UK National Film Awards on 29 March 2017.

A Christmas-themed sequel, A Gift from Bob, was released to UK theatres in November 2020. The film was released posthumously, as Bob the cat died in June 2020.

Plot 
James Bowen is a homeless man and former heroin addict, living on the streets of London and down to his last bits of change. After a life-threatening drug-related incident, his support worker Val gets him into a council flat and prescribes him methadone in an attempt to get him off the street. On his first night in his flat James discovers a cat rifling through his food. Assuming the cat had escaped from somewhere, James tries to return the cat to his real owners.

After letting him go, that same evening the cat returns to James's flat, this time with a purulent wound on his back leg. Worried, James consults his animal-loving but allergic neighbour, Betty. She informs James of a local charity vet where she volunteers, and names the cat Bob. Waiting on a queue at the vet, James misses a meeting with Val.

After the appointment, James has Bob neutered and sets him free. However, Bob keeps following James into town, eventually drawing more crowds of people, making James more wealthy, and he eventually decides to keep Bob. Bob becomes a tourist hotspot and James and Betty start to become romantically attached.

One night while returning home, James finds his old friend, Baz, unconscious on his flat estate, overdosed on heroin. Baz later dies in hospital, and James finds out that Betty cannot be around drug addicts, as her deceased brother had been one. On New Year's Eve, James makes an impromptu visit to his biological father, Jack, his stepmother, Hilary, and his lost sisters, Pris and Faith. After Bob destroys their living room, Hilary sends James and Bob out.

One day, while busking, James gets into an argument with a thug causing the crowd to get in a brawl with the man and James getting arrested for it. Although found innocent, he is prohibited from busking for six months. At the pharmacy where he is waiting to receive his methadone, Betty notices James; they argue and go their separate ways. Later, James visits the offices of The Big Issue to make some more money for him and Bob. He regains his popularity with tourists by selling The Big Issue.

After being accused of illegally selling magazines on another vendor's patch, James and Bob are banned for a whole month. After going back in business James gets into an argument with a rude woman trying to buy Bob off him, losing Bob in the scuffle. Bob does not return for a few days, leaving James devastated. After Bob returns, James feels he is ready to come off the methadone.

After a week of gruelling withdrawal symptoms, James awakes clean and healthy. He goes to visit Betty, who is in the middle of moving and living a life meant for her to live. James and Betty end on a good note. A journalist, Mary, requests to write a book about James and Bob after his Internet and media popularity, and James agrees.

James then fixes up his relationship with his father Jack, and his life turns around for the better. Later, at a book signing, James is celebrated by Val, his father, and a visiting Betty. James and Betty remain supportive friends as James and Bob continue on their journey together.

Cast 
 Luke Treadaway as James Bowen
The real James Bowen makes a cameo appearance, asking an autograph from his character
 Bob as himself
 Stand-ins for Bob: Oscar, Booker, Jafffa, Leo, Ricki and Trayce
 Ruta Gedmintas as Elizabeth "Betty" Robinson, James's animal-loving neighbour and love interest
 Joanne Froggatt as Val, James's drug support worker
 Anthony Head as Jack Bowen, James's remarried father
 Beth Goddard as Hilary Bowen, Jack's wife and James's stepmother
 Caroline Goodall as Mary, an American journalist who persuades him to write a book about Bob
 Darren Evans as Baz, James's old friend who did not recover from heroin addiction
 Ruth Sheen as Elsie, a kind middle-aged woman, who gives presents to Bob
 Nina Wadia as Bus Conductress

Production and release 
On 24 August 2015, it was announced that Roger Spottiswoode would direct a film based on the book A Street Cat Named Bob by James Bowen, while Tim John scripted the film. Adam Rolston would produce the film through his Shooting Script Films. The Exchange sold the film's international rights. Maria Nation also wrote the script.

Principal photography on the film began on 25 October 2015 in London, at Twickenham Film Studios and on location in Covent Garden. Filming wrapped on 6 December 2015.

The world premiere of A Street Cat Named Bob took place at the Curzon Mayfair Cinema, London on 3 November 2016 and was attended by the Duchess of Cambridge. The film opened to the public in the UK on 4 November and in the US on 18 November.

Reception

Box office 
A Street Cat Named Bob grossed $82,703 in the United States and Canada and $17,852,881 in other countries for a worldwide total of nearly $18 million, against a production budget of $8 million.

Critical response
On review aggregator Rotten Tomatoes, the film has an approval rating of 77% based on 65 reviews, with an average score of 5.9/10. The site's critical consensus reads, "A Street Cat Named Bob uses a fact-based feelgood tale as the inspiration for an unapologetically heartwarming movie that should move all but the most cynical of viewers." On Metacritic, the film has a score of 54 out of 100, based on 12 critics, indicating "mixed or average reviews".

Awards and nominations

Awards
National Film Awards UK
Best British Film: 2017

References

External links 
 Official website on Facebook
 
 
 
 
 
 Cats in Film – A Street Cat Named Bob (2016)

2016 drama films
2016 biographical drama films
2010s English-language films
British biographical drama films
Films about cats
Films about heroin addiction
Films about homelessness
Films about pets
Films about writers
Films based on multiple works of a series
Films based on non-fiction books
Films directed by Roger Spottiswoode
Films scored by David Hirschfelder
Films set in London
Films shot at Twickenham Film Studios
Films shot in London
Stage 6 Films films
2010s British films